Polycoccum laursenii is a species of lichenicolous fungus in the family Polycoccaceae. It was first described as a new species in 2004 by Russian mycologist Mikhail Petrovich Zhurbenko. It is found in Alaska and in Russia.

It is similar to Polycoccum cladoniae but differs from it in having smaller spores.

Ecology
Polycoccum laursenii is a lichenicolous fungus, meaning that it infects lichens. Its only documented host species is Cladonia pocillum.

References

Dothideomycetes
Fungi described in 2004
Fungi of North America
Fungi of Asia
Fungi of Russia
Fungi of the United States
Taxa named by Mikhail Petrovich Zhurbenko
Lichenicolous fungi